Unappreciated is the debut studio album by the American girl group Cherish. It was released on August 15, 2006, by Sho'nuff and Capitol Records. The album was co-produced by Jermaine Dupri, along with the group. The sisters co-wrote every song on the album, along with Dupri. In the United States, the album debuted at number 4 on the Billboard 200, selling an estimated 91,000 copies in its first week of release. On September 21 that year, the album was certified Gold by the RIAA, for shipments of 500,000 copies. In Japan, the album debuted and peaked at number 20 on the albums chart. In the United Kingdom, the album debuted at number 80 and sold 30,000 copies.

Two singles were released from the album. The first, "Do It to It", featured the rapper Sean P on guest vocals. The single became the group's first entry on the Billboard Hot 100, where it peaked at number 12. The single also peaked at 9 and 10 on the Pop 100 and Hot R&B/Hip-Hop Songs charts, respectively. In New Zealand, the single peaked at number 3. It also peaked at number 10 in Japan, their first top 10 single there. In Ireland and the United Kingdom the song peaked inside the top 40.

The second single was "Unappreciated", the album's title track. The ballad reached the top 40 in Japan. In the US, the song peaked at number 41 on the Billboard Hot 100. It peaked at number 14 on the Hot R&B/Hip-Hop Songs chart.

The album was promoted mainly through interviews and live performances. The song "Do It to It" was performed twice at televised events. The group also did extensive touring to promote the album. A mini-tour visiting various amusement parks and clubs took place. Later in 2007, the group was the opening act for Ne-Yo, Lil Wayne, Julez Santana and Dem Franchize Boyz, which ran from August to October.

Background
After being featured on Da Brat's single, "In Love wit Chu", Cherish began work on their first album. Cherish's first single, "Miss P", was produced by Jermaine Dupri, written by Kandi and featured Da Brat. They had been signed to the Warner Bros.' imprint Reprise Records. After the success of their collaboration with Da Brat, the single was expected to be a hit. However, it failed to chart on any major charts in the US or elsewhere. It did, however, have minor success on the Hot R&B/Hip-Hop Songs chart in the United States, where it peaked at number 87. Other than a performance of the song on Soul Train in May 2003, the album received little promotion, which can be attributed to its commercial failure. Due to the commercial failure of its lead single, the girls' first album, The Moment, was shelved a few months later. The group then recorded three songs for The Powerpuff Girls: Power Pop soundtrack, called "Chemical X", "Power of a Female" and "Me and My Girls". A music video for "Power of the Female" was released as a promotional single on Cartoon Network in mid-2003.

In 2005, the girls began work on another album. They wrote almost the entire album and said this work was so much more mature and themselves than their unreleased previous work. The album was produced by Jermaine Dupri, Don Vito and Jazze Pha. On March 21, 2006, Cherish released their first single in three years, titled "Do It to It". The single featured Sean P on guest vocals. The single met with a positive critical reception, as well as a strong commercial reception. The single was met with a large amount of success in the US, charting on several Billboard charts. The single became their first to reach the top 20 of the Billboard Hot 100, when it peaked at number 12. The single was also a success on the Pop 100 chart, where it peaked at number 9, as well as the Hot R&B/Hip-Hop Songs chart, reaching a peak of number 10. The single was also a major hit in New Zealand, peaking at number 3 on the official singles chart. It also reached the top 10 in Japan, reaching a peak of number 10 on the chart. The song climbed to the top 40 in the United Kingdom and Ireland, peaking at number 30 and 34 respectively. The song also charted in countries such as Australia, peaking at number 67, Germany, peaking at number 87, and France, reaching a peak of number 48. After the success of the single, the girls released their first album.

Composition
Unappreciated has mainly hip hop and R&B tracks. During an interview about the album, when asked about its composition, the group said, "You can expect a lot of realness, [and] we're trying to bring real R&B back to the world. Right now, R&B is not a genre anymore. It's pop, it's [hip-hop], it's other things. I wanna bring back rhythm and blues." In another interview, the girls talked about how different this album was from their shelved debut. "Well it’s very different coming out now because with this album we have more creative control. When we came out in 2003, we were young and we didn’t have much of a say in what went down. But this time around, we were able to write every song on the album, which makes this album very personal for all of us." They later added, "From this album you can expect realness. Expect to hear all of our individual voices. A lot of crunk tracks like our first single “Do It To It”. Also expect a lot of a cappella singing."

The first track on the album, "That Boi", is an up tempo hip hop song that speaks of a boy who is driving the protagonist insane because she wants him so much. The song was intended to be released as a single. However, due to the merger of Capitol Records and Virgin Records, all single plans were canceled. "Do It to It" is the second song on the album, as well as the lead single. An uptempo dance track, the song was received positively by critics. It was also commercially successful, peaking inside the top 20 of the Billboard Hot 100 singles chart. The third song is "Chevy", and is yet another up tempo song with an R&B tint. The song speaks of the protagonist wanting to be "treated like a Chevy", stating "you can show me off". Some of the lyrics have been seen as sexual. The fourth song on the album is "Unappreciated", which was the second single. The R&B ballad had a somewhat successful commercial performance, peaking inside the top 40 in Japan, as well as peaking at 41 on the Billboard Hot 100, becoming their second to enter the chart. The fifth song is "Taken", an upbeat track that speaks of meeting someone at a club who treats them well and hooks up with them, even though they are taken. "Stop Calling Me" is the sixth track on the album, and is more slower paced than other tracks. It speaks of the protagonist who is trying to end the relationship, but her partner keeps calling, and will not give up on them.

"Oooh" is the seventh song on the album, and is a more R&B tinted song. It speaks of the protagonist imagining all of the things she could do with her lover, but she is unsure if she is ready. The eighth song on the album is "Chick Like Me". The track features Rasheeda on guest vocals, and speaks about how boys want a "chick like me". "Whenever", the R&B ballad, is the ninth song on the album. It speaks of being there for a significant other when they need you the most. The tenth song on the album is "Show & Tell". The mid-tempo track was meant to be a future single, along with "That Boi". However, due to the merger between Capitol Records and Virgin Records, all future singles were canceled, leaving the track unreleased. "Fool 4 You" is a soft R&B track that speaks of the protagonist not being able to get over her past relationship. The last song on the album is the ballad "Moment In Time". It speaks of a couple who is on the verge of breaking up. The protagonist speaks of how she cannot go on without him.

Release

Singles
Two singles were released. The first of these, "Do It to It", was released on March 21, 2006, and featured the rapper Sean P on guest vocals. The single was met with positive critical reception, as well as a strong commercial reception. It had a large amount of success in the US, charting on several Billboard charts. The single became their first to reach the top 20 of the Billboard Hot 100, when it peaked at number 12. The single was also success on the Pop 100 chart, where it peaked at number 9, as well as the Hot R&B/Hip-Hop Songs chart, reaching a peak of number 10 on that chart. The single also was a major hit in New Zealand, peaking at number 3 on the official singles chart. It also reached the top 10 in Japan, reaching a peak of number 10 on the chart. The song also climbed to the top 40 in the United Kingdom and Ireland, peaking at number 30 and 34 respectively. The song also charted in countries such as Australia, peaking at number 67, Germany, peaking at number 87, and France, reaching a peak of number 48.

The second official single was "Unappreciated", which is also the album's title track. The ballad was met with far less commercial success than its predecessor. It was, however, a top 40 hit in Japan. In the US, the song barely missed out on the top 40 on the Billboard Hot 100, peaking at number 41. It did, however, become their second top 20 hit on the Hot R&B/Hip-Hop Songs chart, peaking at number 14. In the United Kingdom, the single debuted and peaked at number 187. The third single was to be "Chevy", but the merger of Capitol and Virgin Records prevented the release of not only Cherish's, but Chingy's, LeToya's, and Janet Jackson's third single, causing the song to be released for promo only. "That Boi" and "Show & Tell" were scheduled to be released as a single but they never were released due to the merge. However, they were aired on some radio stations in the U.S.

Promotion
The album was promoted mainly through interviews and live performances. The group performed their single, Do It to It on BET's 106 & Park & during the pre-show at the BET Awards 2006, and again on August 1, 2006 on ABC's Live with Regis & Kelly, and once more during BET's 106 & Party New Year's Eve special to introduce 2007. The group also made a special appearance on ABC's Good Morning America to introduce the snap dance and on August 15, 2006, the group made a live appearance on MTV's TRL to promote the release of their album. And in late November 2006, the group performed their single Unappreciated on BET's 106 & Park, which sparked rumors that Bow Wow & Cherish had some sort of altercation during the live taping. The group also embarked on their own mini-tour to promote the album, with shows at venues such as Six Flags and Orlando Studios. During this time Cherish was the only female group on select dates, as the opening act for Chris Brown's 'Up Close & Personal Tour', along with Ne-Yo, Lil Wayne, Julez Santana & Dem Franchize Boyz, which ran from August to October. Cherish ended up canceling a handful of their live shows, mainly their Californian concerts, due to rumors saying the group is very unorganized; it is stated that Neosha is the only member in the group who is organized and Farrah's son Jayden being sick, which caused the group to either cancel shows or shorten their live set with Farrah being absent. However, Cherish then went on a European promotional tour in November, and finished up the year with a few Jingle Jam shows in December.

Critical reception

Mark Edwards Nero, of about.com praised the album, stating, "They might not exactly be the new Destiny's Child, but the four members of Cherish definitely show a lot of promise on their debut album. Fans of snap music, pop-R&B and/or dance club jams should be happy with the upbeat, youthful exuberance displayed throughout Unappreciated." Nero praised the album for its "youthful energy", as well as its "soulful bounce". He also commented that he enjoyed the "mature, meaningful lyrics". However, Nero did criticize "the girls' shallow vocal range" as well as the "lack of distinction between the girls' voices". A reviewer for "somekindaoh" commented on the album, stating, "Cherish may not be the 2nd coming of any infamous girl group from the past but this actually works in their favor. The lack of pressure from comparisons will give them ample room to breathe and time to live up to the potential exhibited on this debut. They already know how to write a good lyric and construct a good melody. And once they learn the art of arranging a good vocal is to make it the heart of the song rather than just simply a element in it, I’m pretty sure they’ll find themselves appreciated on a much larger scale."

Andy Kellman of AllMusic gave the album a mixed review, stating, "Though they're still in their late teens and early twenties, they write a lot of their lyrics, and they sound as sure of themselves on Unappreciated as any R&B group with a handful of albums behind them. However, it's clear that they're very much under the influence of their inspirations and contemporaries (from Destiny's Child to Ciara) and aren't yet able to distinguish themselves from what they've absorbed as music fans. Unappreciated is a boilerplate R&B album that's pleasant and likeable, yet it doesn't leave much of an impression and lacks character. Lead single "Do It to It", produced by Don Vito and Cheese, is emblematic in that it's the best track on the album and bears a tremendous resemblance to Ciara's Jazze Pha-produced hits (all the way down to its cadence)." Michael Endelman of Entertainment Weekly said of the album, "This month's model is Cherish, a cheery female foursome that blends the rapid call-and-response vocals of Destiny's Child with the slithery club grooves of Ciara. The mix works, creating a debut that matches of-the-moment beats with sticky melodies. The best cut on Unappreciated is the Don Vito-produced single "Do It to It," which gives the Southern micro-genre known as snap music (think D4L's Laffy Taffy) a Top 40 makeover with a slinky percolating beat and a sweetly cooing chorus." He ended the review by giving the album a "B" rating.

Commercial performance
In the United States, the album debuted at number 4 on the Billboard 200, selling an estimated 91,000 copies in its first week of release. On September 21 of the same year, the album was certified Gold by the RIAA, for shipments of 500,000 copies. The album debuted and peaked at number 20 on the Japanese Albums Chart. In the United Kingdom, the album debuted at number 80, and to date has sold only 30,000 copies there. The album was certified Platinum by the RIAA on December 23, 2006 for shipping one million units to stores.

Track listing

Charts

Weekly charts

Year-end charts

References

2006 debut albums
Cherish (group) albums
Capitol Records albums
Albums produced by Jasper Cameron
Albums produced by Jazze Pha
Snap albums